Brooke Mooney (born February 15, 1996) is an American rower. She competed in the women's eight event at the 2020 Summer Olympics.

References

External links
 

1996 births
Living people
American female rowers
Olympic rowers of the United States
Rowers at the 2020 Summer Olympics
Place of birth missing (living people)
21st-century American women